{{DISPLAYTITLE:C10H8O3}}
The molecular formula C10H8O3 (molar mass: 176.16 g/mol, exact mass: 176.0473 u) may refer to:

 Herniarin, a methoxy analog of umbelliferone
 Hymecromone